Gerry Anderson (1929–2012) was a British television producer who worked with marionettes.

Gerry Anderson may also refer to:
Gerry Anderson (broadcaster) (1944–2014), Northern Irish radio broadcaster
Gerry Anderson, director of the 2005 film No Rules

See also
Jerry Anderson (disambiguation)
Gerald Anderson (disambiguation)
Gerard Anderson (1889–1914), British hurdler
Gary Anderson (disambiguation)